Shelley Mathew Malil (born December 23, 1964) is an Indian-American actor. Malil emigrated to the United States in 1974.  He appeared in a number of television shows and films, including The 40-Year-Old Virgin (2005).

In 2010, Malil was convicted of attempted premeditated murder and assault with a deadly weapon on a former girlfriend, and served 8 years of a 12 year to life term at Ironwood State Prison in southern California.

Early life
Malil was born in Kerala, India. He emigrated with his family in 1974 to the United States at the age of 9. He started acting in high school. As a child, he had hoped to become a comedic actor like Bob Hope, whom he had first seen on television.  In summer 1983, aged 18, he performed on stage as part of the summer stock company at the Granbury Opera House in Granbury, Texas.

Acting career
Malil came to Hollywood in 1995, after a two-year stint at New York's American Academy of Dramatic Arts.  He had supporting roles in The 40-Year-Old Virgin (2005), Holes (2003), Collateral Damage (2002), Getting There (2002), Boys From Madrid (2000), My Favorite Martian (1999), Columbus Day (2008), and Just Can't Get Enough (2002).  Malil had roles on television shows such as Scrubs, Reba, NYPD Blue, The West Wing, The Jamie Foxx Show, and ER .

He was selected as one of the "Top 10 Overlooked Performances of 2005" by the Associated Press for his performance in The 40-Year-Old Virgin.  He is the recipient of a Clio Award (for the Budweiser beer commercials) and a Los Angeles Ovation Award as Best Featured Actor for his performance as Bottom in A Midsummer Night's Dream, and he was nominated for the Los Angeles Ovation Award for his performance in SubUrbia.

Attempted murder conviction
On August 10, 2008, Malil stabbed an ex-girlfriend, Kendra Beebe, 23 times in San Marcos, California.  He was arrested the next day as he got off a train in Oceanside, California.  Beebe had survived the attack despite a severe cut to her chin, the collapse of both lungs, and the loss of about half the blood in her body.

In September 2010, he was convicted of attempted murder and assault with a deadly weapon. and sentenced to life imprisonment with the possibility of parole after 12 years. He was paroled four years early in September 2018.

References

External links

1964 births
Living people
Male actors from California
American people convicted of assault
American people convicted of attempted murder
Indian emigrants to the United States
American people of Malayali descent
People paroled from life sentence
Prisoners sentenced to life imprisonment by California
20th-century American male actors
21st-century American male actors
American male actors of Indian descent
Naturalized citizens of the United States
21st-century Indian criminals